Frederick Phisterer (October 11, 1836 – July 13, 1909) was a German immigrant, American soldier, and author who fought for the United States in the American Civil War. Phisterer received his country's highest award for bravery during combat, the Medal of Honor. Phisterer's medal was won for actions at the Battle of Stones River at Murfreesboro, Tennessee, now marked by the Stones River National Battlefield. He was honored with the award on December 12, 1894.

Biography
Phisterer was born in Stuttgart, Germany. He joined the Army from Medina County, Ohio, in December 1855, and served in the 3rd Artillery Regiment for 5 years. He re-enlisted with the 18th Infantry Regiment in July 1861, and was commissioned as an officer the following October. He eventually rose to the rank of captain, and was honorably discharged in August 1870.

He was a longtime officer of the New York Militia, and played a large role in the militia's reorganization as part of the National Guard.  He attained the rank of colonel, and was promoted to the brevet rank of brigadier general for his service to organize and train soldiers for the Spanish–American War. He acted as New York's Adjutant General in 1901 and 1902, and was promoted to brevet major general at his retirement as recognition of his many years of successful service.

General Phisterer was a companion of the New York Commandery of the Military Order of the Loyal Legion of the United States and a member of the Order of Indian Wars of the United States.

He died in Albany, New York, and was buried at Green Lawn Cemetery, Columbus, Ohio.

Medal of Honor citation

Bibliography
 The Regular Brigade of the Fourteenth Army Corps, the Army of the Cumberland, in the battle of Stone River, or Murfreesboro, Tennessee, from December 31st, 1862, to January 3d, 1863 (1883)
 Statistical Record of the Armies of the United States (1883)
 New York in the War of Rebellion, 1861-1865 (1912)

See also
 List of American Civil War Medal of Honor recipients: M–P

References

External links
 
 

1836 births
1909 deaths
American Civil War recipients of the Medal of Honor
19th-century German people
German-born Medal of Honor recipients
German emigrants to the United States
People of Ohio in the American Civil War
Union Army soldiers
United States Army Medal of Honor recipients
Phisterer
Military personnel from Stuttgart
Foreign-born Medal of Honor recipients